Tony Chan may refer to:

Tony Chan (businessman) (born 1959), Hong Kong businessman and geomancer
Tony F. Chan, mathematician and the president of King Abdullah University of Science and Technology (KAUST)
Antonio Canale,  Italian comic writer and artist, also known under the pen name Tony Chan